"The Hitch-Hiker" is episode sixteen of the American television anthology series The Twilight Zone which originally aired on January 22, 1960 on CBS. It is based on Lucille Fletcher's radio play The Hitch-Hiker. It is frequently listed among the series' greatest episodes.

Opening narration

The narration continues after the dialogue between Nan and the mechanic.

Plot
Nan Adams, on a cross-country road trip from New York City to Los Angeles, gets a flat tire on U.S. Route 11 in Pennsylvania and survives losing control of the car and skidding onto the shoulder. The mechanic she has called to come put a spare tire on comments that he is surprised she survived, saying "you shouldn't have called for a mechanic. Somebody should've called for a hearse." He directs her to follow him into town where he will supply her with a new tire. As she is driving from the site of her blow-out, Nan notices a shabby and strange-looking man hitchhiking. Later, as she is preparing to leave the service station in town, she again sees this hitchhiker, but the mechanic does not see him when she mentions it. Unnerved, she drives away. As she continues her trip, Nan sees the same hitchhiker thumbing for a ride again in Virginia and at several other points in her journey.

She grows increasingly frightened of him. When she stops at a railroad crossing for an oncoming train, the man is situated on the other side of the tracks. She decides to drive ahead but the car stalls on the tracks. She manages to restart the vehicle and back up just as the train speeds past.

Nan is now convinced that the hitchhiker is trying to kill her. She continues to drive, becoming more and more afraid, stopping only when necessary. Every time she stops, however, the hitchhiker is there, always ahead of her.

She takes a side road in New Mexico but gets stranded when she runs out of gas. She reaches a gas station on foot but it is closed; although she rouses the proprietor from bed, he refuses to reopen and sell her gas due to the late hour. Nan is startled by a sailor on his way back to San Diego from leave. Eager for protection from the hitchhiker, she offers to drive the sailor all the way to his destination. He gladly accepts and persuades the station attendant to provide gas. As they drive together and discuss their mutual predicaments, she sees the hitchhiker on the road and swerves toward him. The sailor, who cannot see him, questions her driving; she admits she was trying to run over the hitchhiker. The sailor begins to fear for his safety and leaves her, despite her efforts to have him stay, even going so far as offering to go out with him.

In Arizona, Nan stops to call her mother in Manhattan, New York City. The woman who answers the phone says Mrs. Adams is in the hospital, having suffered a nervous breakdown after finding out that her daughter, Nan, died in Pennsylvania six days ago when the car she was driving blew a tire and overturned. Nan realizes the truth: she didn't survive the accident in Pennsylvania and the hitchhiker is none other than the personification of death, patiently and persistently waiting for her to realize that she has been dead all along. She loses all emotion, concern, and feels empty.

Nan returns to the car and looks in the vanity mirror on the visor. Instead of her reflection, she sees the hitchhiker, who says, "I believe you're going...my way?"

Closing narration

Episode notes

In the original radio play by Lucille Fletcher, the character of Nan was a man named Ronald Adams. The Hitch-Hiker was first presented on The Orson Welles Show (1941), Philip Morris Playhouse (1942), Suspense (1942), and The Mercury Summer Theater (1946).  All of these radio productions starred Orson Welles as Ronald Adams.

Serling named his character "Nan", after one of his daughters.

Nan's car is a light-colored 1959 Mercury Montclair four-door hardtop that had the inside rear-view mirror and front door vent windows removed. However, in the scene where Nan swerved toward the hitch-hiker, the car shown is a black 1957 Ford two-door sedan.

When the teleplay was adapted for radio on The Twilight Zone Radio Dramas in 2002, the role of Nan Adams was played by Kate Jackson.

This episode was mentioned in Joy Fielding's novel See Jane Run.

References

Sources
DeVoe, Bill. (2008). Trivia from The Twilight Zone. Albany, GA: Bear Manor Media. 
Grams, Martin. (2008). The Twilight Zone: Unlocking the Door to a Television Classic. Churchville, MD: OTR Publishing.

External links
 
Suspense — The Hitch-Hiker

1960 American television episodes
The Twilight Zone (1959 TV series season 1) episodes
Television episodes about death
Television episodes about personifications of death
Television episodes about ghosts
Fiction about hitchhiking
Television episodes written by Rod Serling
Television episodes set in Pennsylvania